Clergue is a surname. Notable people with this surname include:

 Bernard Clergue, French bayle
 Francis Clergue (1856–1939), American businessman
 François-Léon Clergue (1825–1907), French priest
 Lucien Clergue (1934–2014), French photographer
 Pierre Clergue, French priest

See also
 , Canada
 Ermatinger Clergue National Historic Site, Canada